The Little Sioux River Bridge is a historic structure located northwest of Spencer, Iowa, United States. The bridge was originally located at Main Street, south of downtown Spencer over the same river. Two previous bridges had been located at the original location beginning in 1875, with a replacement in 1889. Clay County contracted with Clinton Bridge and Iron Works from Clinton, Iowa in 1900 to build this Pennsylvania through truss span. Completed the following year, it is the rare example of this type of bridge built in Iowa. A concrete arch span replaced this bridge in 1915, and it was moved to its current location the same year. The concrete abutments were built by Thor Construction Company from Cedar Falls, Iowa. The bridge was listed on the National Register of Historic Places in 1998.

See also
 
 
 
 
 List of bridges on the National Register of Historic Places in Iowa
 National Register of Historic Places listings in Clay County, Iowa

References

Infrastructure completed in 1901
Truss bridges in Iowa
Transportation buildings and structures in Clay County, Iowa
National Register of Historic Places in Clay County, Iowa
Road bridges on the National Register of Historic Places in Iowa
Pennsylvania truss bridges in the United States